The 2017–18 Cymru Alliance (known as the Huws Gray Cymru Alliance for sponsorship reasons) is the 28th season of the top football league in North Wales. Mirroring its South Wales counterpart the Welsh Football League Division One, the 16-team division forms half of the second tier of the Welsh football league system and falls one level below the nationwide Welsh Premier League. The season began 12 August 2017 and is scheduled to conclude on 31 March 2018.

Teams
Prestatyn Town were champions in the previous season and were promoted to the 2017–18 Welsh Premier League; they were replaced by both relegated teams from the 2016–17 Welsh Premier League, Airbus UK Broughton and Rhyl.

The bottom four teams from the previous season, Llanfair United, Mold Alexandra, Conwy Borough and Buckley Town, were all relegated to various third-tier district leagues for 2017–18. Three teams were successful in the 2016–17 Welsh third-tier leagues and were promoted in their place: Llandudno Junction (Welsh Alliance League runners-up, champions Glantraeth declined promotion), Queens Park (Welsh National League champions) and Rhayader Town (Mid Wales Football League champions).

On 27 July 2017, Rhayader Town withdrew from the league, citing that their players were unwilling to commit to the extra travelling involved with promotion. There was no replacement team - the league continued with 15 teams for this season only, playing 28 games each.

Stadia and locations

League table

Results

References

External links

2017–18 in Welsh football
Cymru Alliance seasons